George Hodge may refer to:

 George Hodge (cricketer) (1878–1953), cricket player from New Zealand
 George Baird Hodge (1828–1892), Confederate politician from Kentucky

See also
George Hodges (disambiguation)